Burrowbridge is a village and civil parish in Somerset, England, situated on the River Parrett and A361 road in the Somerset West and Taunton district, on the edge of the Somerset Levels.

History
The name probably comes from the Old English buruh (fortified hill) and brycg (bridge).

In the village is Burrow Mump, an ancient earthwork now owned by the National Trust, presented by Major A.C. Barrett in 1946 as a war memorial. Burrow Mump is also known as St Michael's Borough or Tutteyate. It is a natural hill of Triassic sandstone capped by Keuper marl. Excavations showed evidence of a 12th-century masonry building on the top of the hill. The first recorded writing mentioning this site is from William of Worcestre about 1480 when he referred to it as Myghell-borough. A medieval church dedicated to St Michael from at least the mid 15th century formed a sanctuary for royalist troops in 1645. The ruins visible today are from the 18th century.

The historic area of the Isle of Athelney is located towards the western part of the village.

Prior to 1826, the bridge over the River Parrett, just below the junction with the River Tone, consisted of three arches, each only a little wider than the barges which used the river. They restricted the flow of water in times of flood, and made navigation difficult. The bridge was highlighted in a report made by William Armstrong in 1824, as a factor which would prevent the River Tone Navigation competing with the new Bridgwater and Taunton Canal, then being built. An Act of Parliament was obtained in 1824 by the Turnpike Commissioners, authorising the construction of a new bridge and the removal of the old. A design for a 70-foot (21 m) single-span bridge in cast iron was dropped because of the cost of cast iron at the time, and instead a stone bridge was built and completed in 1826. It is the longest single span masonry road bridge in the county, and was the last toll bridge in Somerset, before being 'freed' in 1946. Just below the bridge there was a shoal of rocks and stones, which was also mentioned in Armstrong's report, but no action was taken to remove it. Except on spring tides, Burrowbridge was the normal upper limit for barges riding the incoming tide. Above here, horses were used to pull the boats, either towards Langport or along the River Tone towards Taunton.

There are four active pumping stations within the parish: all are now electric, with diesel backup. One more is redundant: the Aller Moor station near the bridge is now incorporated into a private house. The original mid 19th century machinery is listed and preserved in situ. A few miles west is the preserved very early Westonzoyland Pumping Station Museum, which is in steam on regular occasions.

Governance

The parish council has responsibility for local issues, including setting an annual precept (local rate) to cover the council's operating costs and producing annual accounts for public scrutiny. The parish council evaluates local planning applications and works with the local police, district council officers and neighbourhood watch groups on matters of crime, security and traffic. The parish council's role also includes initiating projects for the maintenance and repair of parish facilities, as well as consulting with the district council on the maintenance, repair and improvement of highways, drainage, footpaths, public transport and street cleaning. Conservation matters (including trees and listed buildings) and environmental issues are also the responsibility of the council.

The village falls within the non-metropolitan district of Somerset West and Taunton, which was established on 1 April 2019. It was previously in the district of Taunton Deane, which was formed on 1 April 1974 under the Local Government Act 1972, and part of Taunton Rural District before that. The district council is responsible for local planning and building control, local roads, council housing, environmental health, markets and fairs, refuse collection and recycling, cemeteries and crematoria, leisure services, parks and tourism.

The civil parish was created in the 1980s as the result of a Local Government Boundary Commission review. Originally what is now the civil parish area was split between five separate parishes: Stoke St Gregory in Taunton Deane, and North Petherton, Westonzoyland, Middlezoy and Othery, all in Sedgemoor district. The parish council was first elected in 1985.

Somerset County Council is responsible for running the largest and most expensive local services such as education, social services, libraries, main roads, public transport, policing and fire services, trading standards, waste disposal and strategic planning.

It is also part of the Taunton Deane county constituency represented in the House of Commons of the Parliament of the United Kingdom. It elects one Member of Parliament (MP) by the first past the post system of election, and was part of the South West England constituency of the European Parliament prior to Britain leaving the European Union in January 2020, which elected six MEPs using the d'Hondt method of party-list proportional representation.

People associated with Burrowbridge
Alfred the Great

References

External links

Villages in Taunton Deane
Somerset Levels
Civil parishes in Somerset